The 1998 Japanese motorcycle Grand Prix was the first round of the 1998 Grand Prix motorcycle racing season. It took place on 5 April 1998 at the Suzuka Circuit. The rookie Max Biaggi surprised everyone by winning his first ever GP500 race.

500 cc classification
Source:

250 cc classification
Source:

125 cc classification
Source:

Championship standings after the race (500cc)

Below are the standings for the top five riders and constructors after round one has concluded. 

Riders' Championship standings

Constructors' Championship standings

 Note: Only the top five positions are included for both sets of standings.

References

Japanese motorcycle Grand Prix
Japanese
Motorcycle Grand Prix